Penicillium jacksonii is a species of the genus of Penicillium.

References

 

jacksonii
Fungi described in 2011